Canonica is a surname. Notable people with the name include:

Emanuele Canonica (born 1971), Italian golfer
Luigi Canonica (1762–1844), Swiss architect and urban planner
Pietro Canonica (1869–1959), Italian sculptor, painter, opera composer, professor of arts and senator for life
Sibylle Canonica (born 1957), Swiss actress

See also
Canonica d'Adda, is a comune in the Province of Bergamo in the Italian region of Lombardy
Eupithecia canonica, is a moth in the family Geometridae